Sven André Marie Braken (born 12 June 1992) is a Dutch professional footballer who plays as a striker for Eerste Divisie club VVV-Venlo, which he captains. He most notably played for MVV, NEC and Livorno.

Career

MVV
Braken was born in Maastricht, and made his professional debut for hometown club MVV on 22 April 2011 in a 2–1 home win over Telstar in the Eerste Divisie, replacing the injured Lance Voorjans in the 40th minute. 

He scored his first goal for the club on 23 November 2012, delivering the equalizer on his first touch in the 73rd minute of a league game against Go Ahead Eagles – one minute after coming on as a substitute for Bryan Smeets, as the game ended in a 3–3 draw. 

Braken played five seasons for MVV, in which he made 95 appearances and scored 17 goals.

Almere City
On 16 June 2015, Braken joined Almere City after failing to reach an agreement over a contract extension with MVV. He made his debut for the club, also making his first start, on 7 August in a 3–3 home draw against VVV-Venlo in the Eerste Divisie. On 21 September, his second game for City, he scored his first goals for the club, a brace in a 2–2 away draw against Telstar. Braken sustained a knee injury in a league game against Go Ahead Eagles on 23 October, ruling him out for the remainder of the 2015–16 season.

Braken's time with Almere City was marked by injuries, and he only made sixteen appearances during his two years with the club. He proved himself productive in limited time on the pitch, scoring eleven goals.

NEC
On 16 August 2017, Braken signed a four-year contract with NEC, who had recently been relegated from the Eredivisie. There, he was seen as a replacement for outgoing strikers Taiwo Awoniyi, Kévin Mayi and Jay-Roy Grot. He made his debut for the club on 25 August, immediately scoring his first goal in the 11th minute of play in a 1–1 away draw against Go Ahead Eagles. In the following match he scored a brace, bringing his tally to three goals in two appearances.

Loan to Emmen
Braken joined Eredivisie club Emmen on a six-month loan deal on 23 January 2019. Emmen were struggling in the bottom half of the league table and needed a goalscorer, which they found in Braken who was season top goalscorer for NEC with nine goals in 19 appearances. He made his debut for the club on 26 January, replacing Jafar Arias in the 81st minute of a 3–2 away victory against VVV-Venlo. He made his first start for the club on 10 February, also scoring his first goal for Emmen in a 3–2 home win over ADO Den Haag.

Return to NEC
After managing survival in the Eredivisie with Emmen, Braken returned to NEC for the 2019–20 season. He made three more appearances for the club, scoring once, amidst rumours of a transfer to Querétaro, which eventually fell through in July 2019.

Livorno
On 2 September 2019, Braken signed with Italian Serie B club Livorno. He made his debut for the club, starting in a 2–0 away loss to Ascoli in Serie B on 14 September. On 18 January 2020, Braken scored his first goal for Livorno in a 4–4 home draw against Virtus Entella after an assist by Murilo. Livorno would finish bottom of Serie B, which meant relegation to Serie C.

Braken continued playing for the club in its season in Serie C, contributing with 24 appearances in which he scored six goals. Despite his efforts, Livorno suffered its second successive relegation amid financial irregularities. He made a total of 50 appearances for the club, scoring seven goals, as his contract with the club expired after the 2020–21 season.

VVV-Venlo
On 26 June 2021, Braken returned to the Netherlands where signed a two-year contract with recently relegated Eerste Divisie club VVV-Venlo. He scored his first career hat-trick on 15 April 2022, helping his side to a 3–2 league win over Telstar. With eleven goals in 27 appearances, Braken finished his first season with VVV as club top goalscorer, his most notable a bicycle kick against former club MVV on 4 February 2022. His goal was later awarded Goal of the Season by the Eerste Divisie.

Ahead of the 2022–23 season, Braken was appointed team captain of VVV by new head coach Rick Kruys.

Career statistics

Honours
Individual
 Eerste Divisie Goal of the Season: 2021–22

References

External links
 

1993 births
Living people
Association football forwards
Dutch footballers
MVV Maastricht players
Almere City FC players
NEC Nijmegen players
FC Emmen players
U.S. Livorno 1915 players
VVV-Venlo players
Eredivisie players
Eerste Divisie players
Serie B players
Serie C players
Dutch expatriate footballers
Expatriate footballers in Italy
Dutch expatriate sportspeople in Italy
Footballers from Maastricht